We're Going on a Bear Hunt is a 1989 children's picture book written by Michael Rosen and illustrated by Helen Oxenbury. It has won numerous awards and was the subject of a Guinness World Record for "Largest Reading Lesson" with a book-reading attended by 1,500 children, and an additional 30,000 listeners online, in 2014.

Plot and design
A family of four children (plus a baby sister and their dog), are going out to hunt a bear. They travel through grass (Long wavy grass), a river (Deep, cold river), mud (Thick oozy mud), a forest (A big dark forest) and a snowstorm (A swirling whirling snowstorm) before coming face to face with a bear in a cave (A narrow gloomy cave). This meeting causes panic and the children are told by a bird to start running back home, across all the obstacles (see obstacle phrases below), chased by the bear. Finally, the children return to home and lock the bear out of their house. After the bear retreats, leaving the children safe. The children hide under a duvet and saying: "We're not going on a bear hunt again!" (see below). At the end of the book, the bear is pictured trudging disconsolately on a beach at night, the same beach that is shown on a sunny day as the frontispiece. Most of the illustrations were painted in watercolor. However, the six pictures of the family facing each new hazard are black and white drawings.

At each obstacle is an onomatopoeic description. Before each obstacle the children chant the refrain:

followed by (while crossing the obstacles):

At the end of the bear hunt, they (now safe from the bear at home), conclude with this line:

Characters and location

The eldest of the children (called Stanley “Stan” in the television adaptation) is sometimes mistaken by readers as being their father but is in fact the older brother. They are based on Oxenbury's own children. Likewise, the dog is modelled on an actual family pet.
In the television adaptation, though not in the book, the mother, father, and grandmother of the family make an appearance. Also, the four older children (unnamed in the book) are identified as Stanley, Katie, Rosie, and Max. The baby sister remains nameless. The dog (also anonymous in the book) is called Rufus. 
Stanley is the eldest child, Katie is the second oldest, Rosie is the middle child, Max is the fourth child, and the baby sister (unnamed in both the book and TV adaptation) is the youngest. 
Each of the obstacles, apart from the river, is based on a real life location in England and Wales that Oxenbury knew.

History
The story was adapted from an American folk song. Rosen, who heard the song, incorporated it in his poetry shows and subsequently wrote the book based upon it. Since publication, the book has never been out of print and each year has been in the 5,000 best selling books. The publisher has stated that the book has attained worldwide sales of more than 9 million copies.

Awards
The book won the overall Nestlé Smarties Book Prize in 1989 and also won the 0–5 years category. In 1989 it was an 'Honor Book' in the Boston Globe–Horn Book Awards. The book also won the 'School Library Journal Best Book of the Year' and the 'Mainichi Newspapers Japanese Picture Book Award, Outstanding Picture Book from Abroad' award. It was highly commended for the 1989 Kate Greenaway Medal.

The publisher, Walker Books, celebrated the work's 25th anniversary in 2014 by breaking a Guinness World Record for the "Largest Reading Lesson", with a book-reading by author Rosen that was attended by 1,500 children, with an additional 30,000 online.

Adaptations

Theatre adaptation
The book has been adapted as a stage play by director Sally Cookson with musical score by Benji Bower and design by Katie Sykes. The play has run in the West End and in provincial theatres. The ending of the performance has been changed so that there is a reconciliation between the family and the bear. Time Out magazine, who awarded four stars out of five, whilst describing the performers as "wonderfully entertaining" also said "those in the later primary years might find it a little boring – not an awful lot happens, after all."

Television adaptation

Channel 4 first aired a half hour animated television adaptation on 24 December 2016 at 7:30 pm. It was voiced by Olivia Colman, Mark Williams, and Michael Rosen, in the US dub, the characters are voiced by Anna Faris and Jimmy Kimmel, and Michael Rosen keeps his UK dub. The Daily Telegraph, giving the programme three stars out of five, commented that "The whole thing was skilfully made, but ... did it need to take such a carefree story and cast a pall of gloom?". However, The Guardian said that adaptation was "sumptuous", "prestigious" but that "The animation adds a dose of festive sadness."

Mobile app
A mobile app, based on the book, was launched in December 2016. It is available on Amazon, Android, and Apple platforms.

Cultural impact
In 2013, the novelists Josie Lloyd and Emlyn Rees wrote a bestselling parody of the book, called We're Going On A Bar Hunt, which was illustrated by Gillian Johnson in the style of the original and was published by Constable books and then republished by Little, Brown & Company.

"Bear hunts"
During the COVID-19 pandemic, "bear hunts" became popular with houses across the United States, Belgium,  Netherlands, and Australia placing stuffed bears in windows, in front yards, or on mailboxes for children to look for and find during walks or drives.

Parody 
A book was inspired for an adults joke book "We're Going on a Bar Hunt", by Josie Lloyd and Emlyn Rees and illustrated by Gillian Johnson. In this parody, it tells the story of two parents who book a baby sitter to look after their children while they meet up with two friends and set off for a night on the tiles. They travel through an offie (Trendy new offie), a pub (Groovy gastro pub), a cocktail bar (Funky cocktail bar) and a club (Really rocking club). The two parents and their friends get drunk until they come face to face with a bear (man in a suit). This causes the gang to flee with the bear following and chasing after them all the way back through the obstacles where they all come from. Finally the two friends carry on running away and the parents get to their children, quickly act sober and pay the baby sitter until the bear comes. They shut the door and crash on the sofa and the children jump up from behind at 6 a.m. until their parents sit up and say "We're not going on a bar hunt again!" Like in the book We're Going on a Bear Hunt, the bear is pictured trotting away down the streets.

References

External links
 

1989 British novels
1989 children's books
British picture books
Children's fiction books
Books adapted into plays
Books adapted into television series
Novels adapted into video games
Books about bears
Walker Books books